Sin Salida (Spanish for "No Escape") is the collective name of a series of intermittently major professional wrestling, or Lucha Libre, shows held by the Mexican professional wrestling promotion  professional wrestling promotion Consejo Mundial de Lucha Libre (CMLL). To date CMLL has held six shows under the Sin Salida date. The main event of each of the shows has featured one or more wrestlers putting their hair on the line in a Lucha de Apuesta, or bet match. In 2009 and 2010 the theme of the main event was "Mexico vs. Japan" as CMLL regulars faced off against wrestlers from CMLL's partner  promotion in Japan New Japan Pro-Wrestling (NJPW) and marked the end of extended tours for Yujiro Takahashi, Tetsuya Naito and Taichi Ishikari. In 2013 10 Mini-Estrellas put their hair or their wrestling mask on the line in a Steel cage elimination match where the last man, Pequeño Violencia was shaved bald. CMLL held their most recent Sin Salida show on July 19, 2015.

Event history

The first CMLL event promoted under the Sin Salida name took place on December 4, 2009 and replaced Sin Piedad ("Without Mercy") as CMLL's end-of-year show that year. The event took place on Friday night which is tradition for most of CMLL's major shows and replaced the regular CMLL Super Viernes ("Super Friday") show. To date all Sin Salida shows have taken place in Arena México, in Mexico City, CMLL's main venue. CMLL has held 24 matches split over the four shows so far featuring a total of 78 individual wrestlers. Of those 78 wrestlers 11 of those were from the Mini-Estrella division and six were from CMLL's female division. Negro Casas is the only competitor to work on all four Sin Salida shows. Demus 3:16 worked the 2009 show under the ring name Pequeño Damián 666, while Diamante Azul worked the 2010 event as "Metro" and the 2013 and 2015 event under his current ring name. Each year the main event has featured a Lucha de Apuesta ("Bet match") as their main event, the most important type of match in Lucha Libre. Five men have had to have all their hair shaved off as a result of losing a match, Rey Escorpión, Japanese wrestlers Yujiro Takahashi, Tetsuya Naito and Taichi Ishikari and Mini-Estrella, Pequeño Violencia. In the 2013 event  Aéreo, Eléctrico, Fantasy and Pequeño Nitro bet their wrestling mask on the outcome of the match but all escaped the cage to preserve their masks.

The 2009 show saw CMLL World Tag Team Champions Volador Jr. and La Sombra successfully defend their championship against Los Hijos del Averno (Mephisto and Ephesto) in the semi-final match of the night. The 2013 Sin Salida show saw Máscara Dorada defeat Negro Casas to win the NWA World Historic Welterweight Championship in what has so far been the only championship change on a Sin Salida show.| Sin Salida has not yet hosted any of CMLL's annual tournaments.

Dates, venues, and main events

References